Gary Public Schools Memorial Auditorium was a historic public facility in Gary, Indiana. The 5,000 seat auditorium was commissioned by the Gary Land Company, part of the United States Steel Corporation and was designed by Joseph Wildermuth. It was dedicated to residents who died fighting in World War I. It was closed in 1972 and the interior was destroyed during a fire in 1997. The building was demolished in 2020.

See also
 National Register of Historic Places listings in Indiana
 National Register of Historic Places listings in Lake County, Indiana

References

External links
 Gary Memorial Auditorium, Discover Indiana: Gary Public Library.

Buildings and structures in Lake County, Indiana
Event venues on the National Register of Historic Places in Indiana
National Register of Historic Places in Lake County, Indiana
School buildings on the National Register of Historic Places in Indiana
Demolished buildings and structures in Indiana